The Chicago, Milwaukee, St. Paul and Pacific Depot or St. Louis Park Station, now located at 6210 West 37th Street and Brunswick Avenue, St. Louis Park, in the U.S. state of Minnesota was moved from the intersection of Wooddale and 36th Street on Alabama Avenue, where it sat next to the railroad tracks.  The depot served the Milwaukee Road from 1887 to 1968 and now serves as a museum for the St. Louis Park Historical Society.

References

External links
 

Railroad museums in Minnesota
Railway stations on the National Register of Historic Places in Minnesota
Railway stations in the United States opened in 1887
Railway stations closed in 1968
St. Louis Park, Minnesota
Transportation buildings and structures in Hennepin County, Minnesota
Former railway stations in Minnesota
1887 establishments in Minnesota
1968 disestablishments in Minnesota
National Register of Historic Places in Hennepin County, Minnesota